Fred Charles Sands (February 16, 1938 – October 23, 2015) was an American business executive and real estate investor. He served as the Chairman of Vintage Capital Group.

Early life
Fred Charles Sands was born to a Jewish family on February 16, 1938, in Manhattan, New York City. His father was a taxi driver. He moved to Boyle Heights, Los Angeles, California, with his parents in 1945, when he was seven years old.

Sands was educated at Roosevelt High School. He attended the University of California, Los Angeles.

Career
Sands established Fred Sands Realtors, a real estate company headquartered in Brentwood, Los Angeles, in the 1960s. Over the years, the company opened 65 offices in California. In 2000, he sold it to Coldwell Banker. The merger was managed by Lloyd Greif.

Sands headed two private investment firms, Vintage Capital Group and Vintage Real estate, both headquartered in Los Angeles. Vintage Capital Group invested in a variety of businesses and industries, specializing in turnarounds of distressed companies and bankruptcies.  Vintage Real Estate and Vintage Fund Management were both wholly owned divisions of the Group. The company typically acquired underperforming shopping centers and renovated them. Among the firm's current projects is SouthBay Pavilion, in Carson, California. Fred also owned radio stations and hotels in the past.

Sands was the original estate agent for Mulholland Estates, a gated community in Los Angeles.

Sands was a co-founder of the Museum of Contemporary Art, Los Angeles, and served as the Vice Chairman of its board of trustees. He also served on the board of trustees of the Los Angeles Opera.

Sands was appointed by President George W. Bush to the President's Advisory Committee on the Arts and a liaison to the Kennedy Center. He was also appointed by Governor Arnold Schwarzenegger to the California Arts Council.

Personal life
Sands married Carla Herd in 1998. They resided in Bel Air and collected art. He had a son, Jonathan, and a daughter, Alexandra.

Death
Sands died of a stroke in Boston, Massachusetts, on October 23, 2015, at the age of 77. His funeral was held at the Wilshire Boulevard Temple in Los Angeles, California, on October 30, 2015.

References

External links 
 Vintage Capital Group 
 Vintage Real Estate 
 Vintage Fund Management 

1938 births
2015 deaths
People from Manhattan
People from Bel Air, Los Angeles
University of California, Los Angeles alumni
Businesspeople from California
Philanthropists from California
American art collectors
Jewish American philanthropists
Pepperdine University people
Philanthropists from New York (state)
American real estate businesspeople
20th-century American businesspeople
21st-century American Jews